Melana Scantlin (born December 4, 1977 Gladstone, Missouri) is an American entertainment journalist and former Miss Missouri USA, All-American Scholar recipient and former reality TV participant who has competed in the Miss Teen USA and Miss USA pageants.

Scantlin's first beauty pageant win came in 1995 when she became Miss Missouri Teen USA. She went on to represent Missouri in the Miss Teen USA 1995 pageant broadcast live from Wichita, Kansas in August 1995, and placed in the semifinals.

In 2001, she won the Miss Missouri USA 2002 title, becoming the fifth former Miss Teen USA delegate to win the title.  She went on to represent Missouri in the Miss USA 2002 pageant broadcast live from Gary, Indiana on March 2, 2002.

Scantlin became widely known in 2003 on the first season of the TV series Average Joe.  She was expecting to start off meeting a bunch of hunks, but was instead inundated with mostly plain-looking and/or obese suitors. Later on in the show, three model types of men were brought in to compete against the Average Joes. She chose "pretty boy" Jason Peoples over Average Joe Adam Mesh. After the show, Melana and Jason flew off in a private jet for a romantic getaway. The two made the rounds of TV talk shows, but later started seeing other people.

She has hosted World Series of Blackjack, Red Carpet Specials and Live Panel Discussions'.  She's also appeared on Days of Our Lives, 20 Most Awesomely Bad Songs on VH1, Sidewalks Entertainment, The Wayne Brady Show, The Tonight Show with Jay Leno, and Live with Regis and Kelly.

In 2004, Scantlin was the co-host of the Screening Room, a movie review segment which airs Fridays on WDAF-TV in Kansas City, Missouri.

Scantlin graduated from Park University in Parkville, Missouri, where she was on the Dean's List, named to the National Dean's List and Who's Who Among College and University Students.  She was also named an All American Scholar.

She resides in Los Angeles, California where she hosts E! News Now since 2009.

Other
She is also the cousin of lead singer Wes Scantlin from Puddle of Mudd.

References

External links
Biography of Melana Scantlin by Miss Missouri USA

1977 births
Living people
Miss USA 2002 delegates
Participants in American reality television series
Park University alumni
People from Gladstone, Missouri
1995 beauty pageant contestants
20th-century Miss Teen USA delegates